Fontainebleau Resorts, LLC, is a resort-hotel company started by South Florida real estate developers Turnberry Associates and the Plant family in 2005 after their purchase of the famous Fontainebleau Hotel in Miami Beach, Florida.  The two families each hold a 50% stake in the company. The company is based in Enterprise, Nevada.

History
The company is headed by Turnberry Principal, Jeffrey Soffer, PLANTworldwide owner Brett Plant, and former Mandalay Resort Group President, Glenn Schaeffer.  The company currently has several ongoing hotel and condominium development projects in Miami Beach and Las Vegas, with several more on the way, and Schaeffer has suggested that Fontainebleau will go public in order to raise money for their multibillion-dollar development plans.

On April 17, 2007, Publishing & Broadcasting Limited announced that it had entered into an agreement to acquire 19% of Fontainebleau Resorts for $250 million.

Schaeffer left Fontainebleau Resorts without comment in May 2009. Schaeffer was primarily responsible for securing more than $3 billion in loans for the Fontainebleau Resort Las Vegas project.

Properties 
 Fontainebleau Miami Beach

Subsidiary companies 
Fontainebleau Las Vegas LLC
Fontainebleau Las Vegas Holdings LLC
Fontainebleau Las Vegas Capital Corp.

References 

Hotel chains in the United States
Companies based in Enterprise, Nevada